Thomas W. Becker (May 17, 1923 – January 24, 1991) was an American professional basketball player. He played for the Cleveland Allmen Transfers in the National Basketball League for one game during the 1944–45 season.

References

1923 births
1991 deaths
American men's basketball players
Basketball players from Ohio
Cleveland Allmen Transfers players
Forwards (basketball)
People from Dover, Ohio